Mercado Roma ("Roma market") is a public market in the format of a gourmet food hall located on Querétaro street in the Colonia Roma Norte neighborhood of Mexico City. The market stalls offer organic and other food products for sale; stands and counters where visitors can eat a variety of cuisines (pozole, tacos, tapas, hamburgers). Some of the stands are from restaurants or shops well known outside the market, such as Que Bo! chocolates, Azul Mexican food and Butcher's hamburgers.

References

External links
 
Official website

Colonia Roma
Food halls
Retail markets in Mexico City